Thumwood is a surname. Notable people with the surname include:

James Thumwood (1790–1853), English cricketer
John Thumwood (1785–1839), English cricketer